Quartet: Russ Freeman/Chet Baker is an album by pianist Russ Freeman and trumpeter Chet Baker recorded in 1956 and released on the Pacific Jazz label early the following year.

Reception

Scott Yanow of Allmusic states, "Baker, who improvises on the date with a fair amount of fire while sticking to his middle register, emerges as the key soloist although Freeman sounds quite original within the genre".

Track listing
All compositions by Russ Freeman except as indicated
 "Love Nest" (Otto Harbach, Louis A. Hirsch) - 4:19
 "Fan Tan" - 5:42
 "Summer Sketch" - 4:37
 "An Afternoon at Home" - 5:13
 "Say When" - 5:02
 "Lush Life" (Billy Strayhorn) - 4:55
 "Amblin'" - 7:13
 "Hugo Hurwhey" - 4:25

Personnel
Chet Baker - trumpet
Russ Freeman - piano
Leroy Vinnegar - bass
Shelly Manne - drums

References 

1957 albums
Chet Baker albums
Pacific Jazz Records albums